Vladimir Anatolyevich Shcherbak (born 26 January 1970) is a Russian football manager and a former player. He is an assistant manager of FC Tekstilshchik Ivanovo.

Personal life
He is the father of Denis Shcherbak.

External links
 

1970 births
Living people
Soviet footballers
Russian footballers
FC Irtysh Omsk players
Russian expatriate footballers
Expatriate footballers in Kazakhstan
FC Kyzylzhar players
Russian football managers
Association football defenders
Russian people of Ukrainian descent